elgooG (the word Google spelled backwards) is a mirrored website of Google Search with horizontally flipped search results, also known as a "Google mirror". It was created by All Too Flat "for fun", which started to gain popularity in 2002. elgooG found practical use in mainland China after the domestic banning of Google, circumventing the Great Firewall, but it no longer works. A WHOIS request shows that the domain "elgoog.com" was registered to Google LLC since 2000, but it is currently for sale. The site has since migrated to the domain "elgoog.im".

Google Easter Eggs
As of 2022 elgooG offers so-called Easter eggs which purportedly existed at some time within Google Search. The manner in which elgooG came into possession of these Easter eggs is unclear, although the site claims to "restore, discover and also create interactive Google Easter Eggs".

com.google

On April 1, 2015, Google created an official mirrored version of Google Search for April Fools' Day. The site was available at com.google, and was the company's first ever use of the .google top-level domain.

See also

 List of Google Easter eggs

References

Google Search
Internet search engines
Internet censorship in China